Gary Grossman was the primary developer of ActionScript programming language.

He currently works with Robert Tatsumi (creators of Adobe Flash) at Zendesk.

In his previous position as a principal scientist at Adobe Systems, Gary was a key architect of the Flash Player, which was once the most popular multimedia player on the web. Gary contributed to six major releases of Flash in various capacities, including individual developer, team architect, and engineering manager.

References

Computer programmers
Living people
Year of birth missing (living people)